Goodenia ramelii  is a species of flowering plant in the family Goodeniaceae and is endemic to central Australia. It is a perennial herb with toothed, elliptic leaves in a rosette at the base of the plant, and racemes of blue flowers.

Description
The leaves on the stems are similar but smaller.

Taxonomy and naming
Goodenia ramelii was first formally described in 1862 by Ferdinand von Mueller in Fragmenta phytographiae Australiae from specimens collected near Attack Creek by John McDouall Stuart. The specific epithet (ramelii) honours Prosper Vincent Ramel, a nurseryman and merchant of Paris.

Distribution and habitat
This goodenia grows in stony soils from the Gibson Desert in Western Australia to the Barkly Tableland in the Northern Territory and Queensland, and south to the far north-west of South Australia.

Conservation status
Goodenia ramelii is classified as "not threatened" by the Government of Western Australia Department of Parks and Wildlife and as of "least concern" under the Northern Territory Government Territory Parks and Wildlife Conservation Act 1976 and the Queensland Government Nature Conservation Act 1992.

References

ramelii
Eudicots of Western Australia
Flora of the Northern Territory
Flora of South Australia
Plants described in 1862
Taxa named by Ferdinand von Mueller